Coryanthes macrocorys is a species of orchid found in Peru.

References

External links

macrocorys
Orchids of Peru